Karl-Gunnar Karlsson-Arnö (26 November 1892 – 30 March 1958) was a Swedish bandy player. Karlsson-Arnö was part of the Djurgården Swedish champions' team of 1912.

References

Swedish bandy players
Djurgårdens IF Bandy players